Amjad Attwan (born 12 March 1997) is an Iraqi professional footballer who currently plays for Al-Shamal in the Qatar Stars League. He can be deployed as a defensive midfielder or central midfielder.

International debut 
On 18 March 2016, Attwan made his first international cap for Iraq against Syria in a friendly match.

International goals
Scores and results list Iraq's goal tally first.

Style of play and Fans
Attwan is a hard-working player. He excels at breaking down opposition plays due to his positional sense, defensive attributes, tactical intelligence and ability to read the game. with high technique. Attwan is a fan-favourite amongst the Iraqi people and fans of Al-Shamal. His unique hairstyle and finesse on the ball makes him a remarkable player to watch.

Honours

Club 
Naft Al-Wasat
Iraqi Premier League: 2014–15

Al-Shorta
Iraqi Premier League: 2018–19
Iraqi Super Cup: 2019

Al-Kuwait
Kuwaiti Premier League: 2019–20
Kuwait Crown Prince Cup: 2019–20

International 
Iraq
Arabian Gulf Cup: 2023

References

External links 
  Amjad Attwan 2016
  Amazing Goals
 
 
 

1997 births
Living people
People from Karbala
Iraqi footballers
Iraqi expatriate footballers
Iraq international footballers
Association football midfielders
Karbalaa FC players
Naft Al-Wasat SC players
Al-Shorta SC players
Najaf FC players
Kuwait SC players
Al-Shamal SC players
Iraqi Premier League players
Kuwait Premier League players
Qatar Stars League players
Footballers at the 2016 Summer Olympics
Olympic footballers of Iraq
2019 AFC Asian Cup players
Expatriate footballers in Kuwait
Expatriate footballers in Qatar
Iraqi expatriate sportspeople in Kuwait
Iraqi expatriate sportspeople in Qatar